The 1974 Cal Poly Pomona Broncos football team represented the University of California, Riverside as a member of the California Collegiate Athletic Association (CCAA) during the 1974 NCAA Division II football season. Led by first-year head coach Bob Toledo, UC Riverside compiled an overall record of 8–3 with a mark of 4–0 in conference play, winning the CCAA title. The team outscored its opponents 233 to 171 for the season. The Highlanders played home games Highlander Stadium in Riverside, California.

UC Riverside competed in the California Collegiate Athletic Association (CCAA). The team was led by first-year head coach Bob Toledo. They played home games at Highlander Stadium in Riverside, California. The Highlanders finished the season as champion of the CCAA, with a record of eight wins and three losses (8–3, 4–0 CCAA). Overall, the team outscored its opponents 233–171 for the season.

Schedule

References

UC Riverside
UC Riverside Highlanders football seasons
California Collegiate Athletic Association football champion seasons
UC Riverside Highlanders football